Brandon Croft Saine (born December 14, 1988) is a former American football running back. He played college football at Ohio State. Saine was signed by the Green Bay Packers as an undrafted free agent in 2011.

High school career
As a junior, Brandon Saine ran for over 1,300 yards and scored 21 touchdowns while receiving All-State, All-Conference, and Conference Player of the Year honors. In his senior year, he ran for 1,895 yards and 27 touchdowns on 259 carries, while recording 30 receptions for 412 yards, And won state.  Saine was the 2006 Mr. Football Award recipient and was ranked second overall in the 2007 football recruiting class from Ohio by Rivals.com, and ranked 50th among the Rivals 100, a list compiled from nationwide recruits. He was said to have run a 4.2 forty time during his senior year 

Saine also lettered in track at Piqua and currently holds the Ohio Division I record in the 100-meter dash, with a time of 10.38, which he set in 2006. He had four state track titles and a national championship in the 60-meter dash.

College career
Saine was compared to Reggie Bush while entering his Freshman year at Ohio State, due to his ability to be a jack of all trades, running, blocking and even spending time in the slot as a WR. Saine has been officially timed at 4.4 seconds in the forty yard dash, although he has been unofficially timed at 4.25 seconds.

Statistics

Professional career
Saine was signed as an undrafted free agent by the Green Bay Packers on July 28, 2011. Saine was released by the Packers on April 24, 2013 after failing a physical.

References

External links
Ohio State profile

1988 births
Living people
American football running backs
Green Bay Packers players
Ohio State Buckeyes football players
People from Piqua, Ohio
Players of American football from Ohio